Hankou railway station is one of the three main railway stations in the city of Wuhan, the capital of Hubei Province of the People's Republic of China. It is located within the section of the city commonly known as Hankou (i.e., the part of the city north of the Yangtze and Hanshui Rivers), several kilometers north of Hankou's historical center. Hankou Station is served by a station of the same name on Line 2 of Wuhan Metro.

History

When the Beijing–Hankou railway from Beijing reached Hankou in the early 20th century, its terminus was Dazhimen railway station (大智门火车站), located right outside the walls of the bustling port city of Hankou. In 1991 Dazhimen station was closed, and services were relocated to the present Hankou railway station, located several kilometers north of central Hankou. The current European-style building was completed in 2010.

Hankou railway station became connected to Wuhan Metro on December 28, 2012, with the opening of Line 2 of the city's subway system.

The station's location near the Huanan Seafood Wholesale Market may have contributed to the spread of the Coronavirus disease 2019. On 23 January 2020, the station was closed, along with  all other transport infrastructure in the city, due to the outbreak of Coronavirus disease 2019. This unprecedented measure in human history became known as the 2020 Wuhan lockdown. On 28 March, the station resumed operation for arrivals only; full operation was resumed on 5 April.

Service 
Like Wuchang railway station on the southern side of the Yangtze, Hankou station is served by trains going in all directions. After the completion of the high-speed Hefei–Wuhan railway from Hefei in April 2009, the Hankou Station became the main Wuhan terminal for the high-speed trains arriving to the city on this line from Shanghai via Nanjing and Hefei, although as of December 2013 at least three of these trains arrives to the Wuhan railway station instead, and some go to Wuchang.

The Hankou railway station is also Wuhan's station for the Wuhan–Yichang railway, which goes west, to Yichang. Eventually, both the Hefei–Wuhan and the Wuhan–Yichang railway will become sections of the Shanghai–Wuhan–Chengdu High-Speed Railway from Shanghai to Hankou to Chengdu.

Gallery

Wuhan Metro 

Hankou Railway Station is a station on Line 2 of the Wuhan Metro. It serves the nearby Hankou railway station.

References

External links
 
 Hankou Railway Station 

Railway stations in Wuhan
Stations on the Beijing–Guangzhou Railway
Wuhan Metro stations
Line 2, Wuhan Metro